Jorge Comas may refer to:
 Jorge Comas (footballer) (born 1960), former Argentine footballer
 Jorge Comas (swimmer) (born 1954), Spanish former swimmer